Bob Peck (May 30, 1891 – June 14, 1932) was an American football player who most famously played center for the Pittsburgh Panthers, where he was a three-time All-American.

Career

Pitt
Peck was a prominent center for "Pop" Warner's Pitt Panthers. He was selected as a first-team All-American in each of 1914, 1915, and 1916. Peck also won  back-to-back national championships in 1915 and 1916. He dropped out of college during the spring of 1916 due to the death of his father, but he was able to academically qualify for the 1916 season – during which Peck served as team captain – by attending class throughout the summer.

Pro ball
In 1917 he played in the Ohio League, the direct predecessor to the modern National Football League for the Youngstown Patricians and the Massillon Tigers. That season, he earned first team all-pro honors. In 1920, Peck played for the Fort Wayne Friars in the team's victory over the Columbus Panhandles.

Culver Academy
Following his time at Pitt, he served as the Athletic director at Culver Military Academy until his unexpected death attributed to heart disease in 1932. He was posthumously elected to the College Football Hall of Fame in 1954.

References

1891 births
1932 deaths
American football centers
Fort Wayne Friars players
Massillon Tigers players
Pittsburgh Panthers football players
Youngstown Patricians players
All-American college football players
College Football Hall of Fame inductees
People from Lock Haven, Pennsylvania
Players of American football from Pennsylvania
Burials at Homewood Cemetery